Giorgi Kilasonia, also known as Gia Kilasonia (born 9 September 1968) is a retired Georgian professional football player, like his older brother, Varlam Kilasonia.

External links

1968 births
Living people
Soviet footballers
Footballers from Georgia (country)
Expatriate footballers from Georgia (country)
Expatriate footballers in Russia
Expatriate footballers in Ukraine
Expatriate sportspeople from Georgia (country) in Ukraine
Expatriate footballers in Azerbaijan
FC Dnipro players
Expatriate sportspeople from Georgia (country) in Azerbaijan
Georgia (country) international footballers
Turan-Tovuz IK players
Ukrainian Premier League players
Association football midfielders
Neftçi PFK players
FC Lokomotiv Saint Petersburg players